The Battle of Mount Sterling was a minor action in the American Civil War that occurred in June 1864 in Mount Sterling, Kentucky.

Background

During the American Civil War, the northern and southern forces took turns occupying Mount Sterling.  On March 22, 1863, about 300 Confederate cavalrymen under Colonel Leroy Cluke captured the city taking 438 prisoners, 222 wagon loads of military goods, 500 mules, and 1000 stand of arms.  The courthouse of Mount Sterling was burned by Confederate troops resulting in the loss of early city records. About one half of Kentucky county courthouses were deliberately burned down during the Civil War, resulting in a vast loss of records.

Battle
On June 8, 1864, General John Hunt Morgan's Cavalry attacked Union forces guarding an important supply depot at Mount Sterling.  The CSA forces attacked the Union camp in Mount Sterling under the command of Captain Edward Barlow.  The CSA captured 380 prisoners and material and took $59,000 from Farmers' Bank.  Leaving a force under Colonel H. L. Giltner, Gen. Morgan moved west with the 2nd Brigade.

Early in the morning on June 9, 1864, US forces under General Stephen G. Burbridge attacked the CSA camped on Camargo Pike under command of Colonel R. M. Martin. Col. H. L. Giltner brought a CSA force from Levee Road to support Col. Martin's besieged men, but both forces were driven back through the town. The CSA counterattack failed to overcome the opposing force and losses were incurred on both sides.

The battle continued sporadically throughout the surrounding countryside, leaving relics like ammunition and sabers buried in the ground, some of which are still being found as fields are plowed.  The battle ended with defeat of the outnumbered Confederates, marking the last of the actual fighting for Montgomery County, Kentucky.  The aftermath of the battle included 8 killed, 13 wounded for the Confederates and 4 killed, 10 wounded for the Union.

Notes

External links
Mount Sterling Tourism
Historical Marker

Mount Sterling
Mount Sterling
Mount Sterling
1864 in Kentucky
June 1864 events
Mount Sterling, Kentucky